Izzeldin Abuelaish,  is a Canadian-Palestinian medical doctor and author. He was born in Gaza, and was the first Palestinian doctor to work in an Israeli hospital and has been active in promoting Israeli-Palestinian reconciliation. During the Gaza War in January 2009, his three daughters and a niece were killed by Israeli tank fire directed at his home. He had been calling in reports about the effect of the war by phone to a TV station. In his regularly scheduled report, in tears, he described their killing on-air, in a video that was widely circulated in Israel and around the world. The Israeli military initially claimed that Dr. Abuelaish's house was targeted because it was the source of sniper fire. A day later the Israelis claimed to be targeting militants. It was further alleged falsely that the dead girls' bodies contained shrapnel from Qassam rockets.

He emigrated to Canada and wrote a 2011 memoir entitled I Shall Not Hate: A Gaza Doctor's Journey on the Road to Peace and Human Dignity. He now resides in Toronto, Canada, with his remaining children.

Life and career 
Abuelaish was born and raised in the Jabalia refugee camp in the Gaza Strip. He received his elementary, preparatory and secondary education in the refugee camp schools.

Abuelaish received a scholarship to study medicine in Egypt. After completing medical studies at Cairo University in 1983, he earned a diploma in Obstetrics and Gynaecology from the University of London.

From 1997 to 2002, he completed a residency in OB/Gyn at the Soroka Medical Center in Beersheba, Israel, followed by a subspecialty in fetal medicine in Italy and Belgium; then  a master's degree in Public Health (Health Policy and Management) from Harvard University.

Abuelaish was the first Palestinian doctor to receive a staff position at an Israeli hospital, where he treated both Israeli and Palestinian patients. He worked as a physician in the Gaza Strip and also worked part-time in Israel at Soroka Medical Center and Sheba Medical Center. After the Hamas takeover of the Gaza Strip in 2007, he was one of the few Gazans to continue entering Israel regularly. He lived in a multi-story building in Jabalia that he and his brother had built. 
In 2008, his wife died of leukemia, and he was left to raise their eight children.

Immediately before the 2008–2009 Gaza War between Palestinian paramilitary groups and the Israel Defense Forces (IDF), he was a researcher at the Sheba Hospital in Tel Aviv and already an important figure in Israeli-Palestinian relations. His daughters had attended a peace camp with Israeli children in the United States.

During the three-week war, he gave reports and interviews to the Israeli media on the situation in Gaza. On January 16, 2009, a few days before the end of the war, an Israeli tank fired two shells at his home, killing three of his daughters and a niece. An Israeli military investigation of the incident concluded that fire had been directed at his house after figures spotted on the roof of the building had been suspected of being observers directing sniper fire against Israeli troops. The incident occurred as he had been corresponding live with Channel 10 reporter Shlomi Eldar, and his reaction to learning of the deaths of his daughters was broadcast live to Israeli audiences.

The death of his daughters strengthened his resolve to promote reconciliation between Israelis and Palestinians.

He founded the "Daughters for Life Foundation" in memory of his three daughters who were killed. The organization provides scholarship awards to encourage young women from Palestine, Israel, Lebanon, Jordan, Egypt and Syria to pursue their studies at universities in Canada, the United States and Belgium. The foundation aims to invest in the potential for young women's leadership and to foster their success.

He is currently Associate Professor of Global Health at the University of Toronto.

He wrote a 2011 memoir entitled I Shall Not Hate: A Gaza Doctor's Journey on the Road to Peace and Human Dignity.

In February 2013, he attended the Karachi Literature Festival in Pakistan where he narrated the events surrounding the death of his daughters killed in the Israeli airstrike. According to The Express Tribune, "there was hardly anyone in the audience who did not choke or wipe away a silent tear while listening to Palestinian doctor and author Izzeldin Abuelaish..." Abuelaish described the event of his daughters' deaths as follows:

He became a Canadian citizen in 2015.

Honours and awards 

 2009: Stavros Niarchos Prize for Survivorship
 2009: Search for Common Ground Award of Search for Common Ground
 2009: Middle East Institute Award of the Middle East Institute
 2009: Nominee, Sakharov Human Rights Prize
 2009 & 2010: Named one of the 500 Most Influential Muslims for two consecutive years by the Royal Islamic Strategic Studies Centre
 2010: Uncommon Courage Award; Queens College Center for Ethnic, Racial and Religious Understanding
 2010: Mahatma Gandhi Peace Award of Canada, Mahatma Gandhi Centre of Canada
 2011: Lombardy Region Peace Prize
 2012: Calgary Peace Prize, Calgary Centre for Global Community and Consortium for Peace Studies at the University of Calgary
 2013: Member of the Order of Ontario, awarded by the Province of Ontario
2013: Top 25 Canadian Immigrant Award winner
 2014: Winner in the internationally reputed category of the Public Peace Prize
 2016: Honorary degree, Simon Fraser University
 2017: Meritorious Service Cross, gifted by the Canadian monarch, his or her Governor-in-Council
 2018: Max Mark Cranbrook Global Peacemaker, Wayne State University, Center for Peace and Coflict Studies. Eric Montgomery, Fred Pearson

Works

References

External links 
Izzeldin Abuelaish Two Years After Israeli Attack that Killed 3 Daughters & Niece – video report by Democracy Now!, January 19, 2011
Dr. Izzeldin Abuelaish – I Shall Not Hate: A Gaza Doctor's Journey on the Path to Peace and Human Dignity,  book tour presentation at Powell's Books in Portland, Oregon, January 18, 2011.

1955 births
Living people
Alumni of the University of London
Cairo University alumni
Harvard School of Public Health alumni
Members of the Order of Ontario
Naturalized citizens of Canada
Palestinian pacifists
Palestinian obstetricians and gynaecologists
People from Jabalia Camp
Recipients of the Meritorious Service Decoration
University of Toronto people